Jahorina is a mountain in Bosnia and Herzegovina, located on the tripoint of the municipalities of Pale, Trnovo, Republika Srpska and Trnovo, Federation of Bosnia and Herzegovina.

The Jahorina ski resort located on the mountain, hosted the women's alpine skiing events of the 1984 Winter Olympics.

History

Bosnian War 
During the Bosnian Civil War, the Republika Srpska used Jahorina as a military base during their 3-year long siege of Sarajevo. The Special Police Brigade established a "special police training centre" on the area's grounds. Many of the Jahorina Centre's officers were later arrested for their involvement in the Srebrenica massacre, especially during one of the massacre's last phases, the Kravica massacre.

21st century 
In 2021, Bosnian Serb political leader, Milorad Dodik, was reported to have carried out "anti-terrorism" drills in the area on behalf of the Republika Srpska, sparking controversy. Critics accused Dodik of threatening Bosnia's stability, while his supporters argued it was legal. The operation occurred during a political crisis in Bosnia, leading to Dodik responding that the blueprint for the drills had begun years before, claiming it had nothing to do with Bosnia's political tensions.

Ski resort
The Jahorina ski resort is situated on the slopes of Jahorina. It is the largest and the most popular ski resort in Bosnia and Herzegovina, being a popular destination for alpine skiing, snowboarding, hiking, and sledding.

Landmine risk
Jahorina was an area of major strategic importance during the Bosnian war. Some areas of the mountain, including areas near the resort, still contain land mines. Extensive de-mining activities have taken place after the war. Skiing in borders of Jahorina ski resort is safe from mines and out-of-bounds areas are marked by skull-and-crossbones signs. Some off-course slopes were mined during the war and many remain risky. On October 30, 2011, a Slovenian paraglider was critically injured on Mount Jahorina when he landed in a minefield by mistake.

See also
 Tourism in Bosnia and Herzegovina

References

External links
 

Mountains of Republika Srpska
Mountains of the Federation of Bosnia and Herzegovina
Istočno Sarajevo
Mountains of Bosnia and Herzegovina